Burramys is a genus of the family Burramyidae, and is represented by one living and 3 extinct (fossil) species. It is one of two genera of pygmy possum, the other being Cercartetus.

Taxonomy

Genus Burramys
†Burramys wakefieldi 
†Burramys triradiatus
†Burramys brutyi
Burramys parvus

References

Possums
Marsupial genera
Mammal genera with one living species
Taxa named by Robert Broom